Kamal Singh Airee (born 19 December 2000) is a Nepalese cricketer. In November 2017, he was part of Nepal's U19 cricket team that beat India in the 2017 ACC Under-19 Asia Cup. In January 2020, he earned his first call-up to the national side, for the One Day International (ODI) tri-series in Nepal. He made his ODI debut for Nepal, against Oman, on 9 February 2020.

In April 2021, he was named in Nepal's Twenty20 International (T20I) squad for the 2020–21 Nepal Tri-Nation Series. He made his T20I debut on 22 April 2021, for Nepal against Malaysia.

References

External links
 

2000 births
Living people
Nepalese cricketers
Nepal One Day International cricketers
Nepal Twenty20 International cricketers
Place of birth missing (living people)